Puerto Rican heraldry has no precise rules, because its evolution has been according to the ideas and prevailing customs of every time of its history.

The Coat of Arms was granted by Ferdinand II of Aragon to the island of San Juan.

Seals
There are several seals of the different sections of the Puerto Rican government.

References

 Puerto Rican
Heraldry